Norman Holwell (6 September 1928 – 7 April 2020) was a British speed skater. He competed in four events at the 1952 Winter Olympics.

References

External links
 

1928 births
2020 deaths
British male speed skaters
Olympic speed skaters of Great Britain
Speed skaters at the 1952 Winter Olympics
Sportspeople from Birmingham, West Midlands